Banshee is the fifth studio album by American band The Cave Singers. It was released on February 19, 2016 under Jagjaguwar.

Track listing

Personnel 
 Pete Quirk – vocals, guitar, melodica, harmonica
 Derek Fudesco – guitar, bass pedals
 Marty Lund – drums, guitar
 Randall Dunn - engineer, producer
 The Cave Singers - engineer, producer
 Jason Ward - mastering
 Cody Fennell - artwork
 Joe Carr - cover
 Lauren Rodriguez - cover
 Jeff Alvarez - layout

References

2016 albums
Jagjaguwar albums
The Cave Singers albums